Pohjanen is a Finnish surname. Notable people with the surname include:

 Bengt Pohjanen (born 1944), Swedish author, translator, and priest
 Anna Pohjanen (born 1974), Swedish footballer

See also
 Pohjonen

Finnish-language surnames